Andrew Ordeen "Andy" Skaar (January 3, 1922 – September 26, 2018) was an American politician in the state of Minnesota. He was born in Thief River Falls, Minnesota. He was an alumnus of the Northwest School of Agriculture, in Crookston, Minnesota, and was a grain and livestock farmer. He served in the House of Representatives for the 66th District from 1963 to 1966, for District 67B from 1967 to 1972, and for District 1B from 1973 to 1974. He lived in Thief River Falls, Minnesota and died at the Thief River Care Center in Thief River Falls.

References

External links

1922 births
2018 deaths
Republican Party members of the Minnesota House of Representatives
People from Thief River Falls, Minnesota
University of Minnesota Crookston alumni
Farmers from Minnesota